The Converse House and Barn are a historic residential property at 185 Washington Street in Norwich, Connecticut.  Built about 1870 for a local businessman and philanthropist, it is a prominent local example of High Victorian Gothic architecture.  The property was listed on the National Register of Historic Places in 1970, and is included in the Chelsea Parade Historic District.

Description and history
The Converse House is located a short way south of Norwich's triangular Chelsea Parade park, on the east side of Washington Street opposite Norton Court.  The house is a -story wood-frame Gothic Revival structure, with asymmetrical massing, vertical board siding, and a polychrome exterior.  The front facade is dominated by a hip-roofed tower on the right, in front of which is a distinctive seven-sided porch.  Front-facing windows are set in peaked-gable openings, and there is decorative woodwork attached to the steep Gothic roof gables.  The interior features fine oak flooring, walnut paneling in the dining room, and a fireplace surround with Dutch landscape in tile. The barn appears to be of similar age to the house, which was built c. 1870.

The house was built about 1870, and is a prominent local example of the High Victorian Gothic style.  It was the home of Colonel Charles A. Converse, a local businessman and philanthropist.  The main change to the house has been a slight enlargement of the kitchen, so that it could be modernized.  Converse is best known locally for donating the Converse Art Gallery to the Norwich Free Academy.

See also
National Register of Historic Places listings in New London County, Connecticut

References

External links

Houses on the National Register of Historic Places in Connecticut
Historic American Buildings Survey in Connecticut
Gothic Revival architecture in Connecticut
Houses completed in 1870
Houses in Norwich, Connecticut
Barns on the National Register of Historic Places in Connecticut
National Register of Historic Places in New London County, Connecticut
Historic district contributing properties in Connecticut